Sealdah railway station (Bengali: শিয়ালদহ রেলওয়ে স্টেশন, station code:SDAH) is one of India's major railway terminals serving the city of Kolkata. It's the busiest railway stations in India in terms of daily passenger's footfall with over 1.2 million. It is an important suburban rail terminal. Kolkata Metro Line 2 passes through Sealdah with the new Sealdah station.

History

Sealdah railway station was started in 1869. Before 1978, there was a tram terminus at Sealdah station. Trams departed from here towards Rajabazar, Howrah Station, Calcutta High Court, Dalhousie Square, Park Circus and Dharmatala. The first horse tram service of Kolkata was also started from Sealdah to Armenian Ghat, following the current route 14 & 16 between Lebutala & Dalhousie Square. The Sealdah–Lebutala & Dalhousie Square–Armenian Ghat (later extended to High Court) stretch is now closed. That terminus was demolished in 1978 also with the Sealdah–Lebutala tram track stretched through Boubazar Street for construction of the Sealdah flyover. Now tram services between Rajabazar–Esplanade, Park Circus–Burrabazar and other services pass through Sealdah. Currently, a car parking exists in place of the old tram terminus.

Operations
 There are three station terminals at Sealdah: Sealdah North, Sealdah Main and Sealdah South.
 The North section consists of Sealdah North and Sealdah Main buildings. It has five platforms in North and 9 platforms in the main section. The platforms of North sections are 1, 2, 3, 4 & 5.
 Sealdah main consists of platform no 6, 7, 8, 9, 10, 11, 12, 13 & 14. One more platform is present beside platform no 14 which is used only by goods trains and high capacity parcel vans.
 The South section consists of Sealdah South terminal, with seven platforms: 15, 16, 17, 18, 19, 20 & 21.
The north and south sections have a separate set of emerging tracks. The north and south sections are connected by two links: Dumdum–Majherhat link (popularly circular rail) and Bidhannagar Road–Park Circus link (extension of circular rail). These two links were constructed to quickly travel between the two sections, avoiding Sealdah.

For the financial department, there are DRMs Sr.DFMs and ADFMs to look over. Sealdah North acts as the suburban train terminal for the main division. The main division of Sealdah north operates trains plying between Kolkata and Hasnabad, Bandel, Ranaghat, Shantipur, Krishnanagar, Berhampore, Lalgola, Dankuni, Katwa, Bardhaman, Kanchrapara, Barrackpore, Kalyani, Kalyani Simanta and others. A narrow-gauge line earlier used to connect Shantipur and Krishnanagar but now it has been replaced with broad gauge. This narrow-gauge line further continued to Nabadwip Ghat and was formerly served by DMU trains (all other lines run EMU trains). Now the suburban train service is also extended from Krishnanagar to Lalgola, which part was previously served by electric loco-hauled trains only. Sealdah–Dankuni (via Vivekananda Setu) line connects Eastern Railway's Howrah–Bardhaman chord at Bally Halt (on a viaduct atop Bally station) and Dankuni. Naihati–Bandel (via Sampreeti Bridge) line connects Eastern Railway's Howrah–Bardhaman main line at Bandel Jn.

Sealdah Main is the mail/express terminal for long-distance trains to northern, north-western, north-eastern and eastern India, through Dankuni line and Bandel line. Krishnanagar line is also serving long distance intrastate trains.

The South section, consisting of Sealdah South terminal, acts as the terminal for local trains plying between Kolkata and Budge Budge, Canning, Diamond Harbour and Namkhana.

There is also an EMU carshed at Sealdah (Narkeldanga). Other EMU carsheds are at Barasat and Sonarpur. A diesel shunter loco shed is also situated at adjacent Beliaghata. A rail coach factory is set to come up at Halishahar-Kanchrapara (Bijpur) region in North 24 Parganas.

Before partition in 1947 of India, trains used to run up to present day Bangladesh along Gede line and Bangaon line. Now Gede line is used by Maitree Express up to Dhaka and Bangaon line is used by Bandhan Express up to Khulna.

Lines 
 Sealdah–Dum Dum–Baranagar–Dakshineswar–Rajchandrapur–Baltikuri–Andul–Kharagpur
 Sealdah–Dum Dum–Baranagar–Dakshineswar–Dankuni–Barddhaman
 Sealdah–Dum Dum–Naihati–Kalyani–Kalyani Simanta
 Sealdah–Dum Dum–Naihati–Kalyani–Ranaghat–Krishnanagar–Berhampore–Lalgola
 Sealdah–Dum Dum–Naihati–Kalyani–Ranaghat–Kalinarayanpur–Krishnanagar
 Sealdah–Dum Dum–Naihati–Kalyani–Ranaghat–Kalinarayanpur–Shantipur
 Krishnanagar–Dignagar–Shantipur
 Sealdah–Dum Dum–Naihati–Kalyani–Ranaghat–Gede
 Sealdah–Dum Dum–Naihati–Bandel–Barddhaman
 Sealdah–Dum Dum–Naihati–Bandel–Nabadwip Dham–Katwa
 Sealdah–Dum Dum–Barasat–Bongaon
 Sealdah–Dum Dum–Barasat–Basirhat–Hasnabad
 Ranaghat–Majhergram–Bongaon
 Sealdah–Ballygunge–Majherhat–BBD Bag–Kolkata
 Sealdah–Ballygunge–Majherhat–Budge Budge–Pujali
 Sealdah–Ballygunge–Sonarpur–Canning
 Sealdah–Ballygunge–Sonarpur–Baruipur–Diamond Harbour
 Sealdah–Ballygunge–Sonarpur–Baruipur–Laxmikantapur–Namkhana

Station facilities

Executive lounge
IRCTC opened the first executive lounge at this station, the first in any of the main stations in the state of West Bengal. In 2019, on the occasion of Bengali New Year, the lounge was opened. It covers around 2,500 sq ft area, and has free Wi-Fi, showers, foods, newspapers, TV, cloak room facilities available. Though on the first floor, it is next to the elevator to make it accessible to wheelchair users.

 The station has a first class air conditioning waiting room and a resting area with bedding facilities.
  Google provides RailWire free high-speed Wi-Fi.
 The station also has many IRCTC food court and restaurants including Haldiram, Jan-Ahaar, Mio Amore and Wow Momos.
 Amazon India has launched an Amazon kiosk in the non-ticketing zone, where passengers can pick up their parcels.
 The station has a large reservation ticketing zone where passengers can book their tickets in advance.

Sealdah Metro Station
Sealdah metro station is an operational station on Line 2 of the Kolkata Metro, located in Sealdah, Kolkata. The underground station adjoins with the Sealdah railway station of the Indian Railways on its eastern side.

Gallery

See also 
 Kolkata Metro
 
 Kolkata Suburban Railway
 List of Kolkata Suburban Railway stations
 Trams in Kolkata

References

External links 
 
 Eastern Railways website

1869 establishments in India
Indian Railway A1 Category Stations
Kolkata Suburban Railway stations
Railway junction stations in West Bengal
Railway stations in Kolkata
Railway stations opened in 1869
Sealdah railway division